Paul Moist is a former national president of the Canadian Union of Public Employees (CUPE), Canada's largest trade union, having served from 2003 to 2015.

Career
Moist first joined CUPE as a teenager in 1975, working first as a lifeguard, then as a greenhouse attendant for the City of Winnipeg. He was elected to his local executive after university and worked as a CUPE staff representative from 1983 to 1993.

Moist served for 10 years as the president of CUPE Local 500, representing Winnipeg municipal workers.  He also served for six years as president of CUPE Manitoba.

Moist became the first western Canadian elected to lead CUPE's 600,000 members in October 2003. Under Moist's leadership, CUPE has focused on branding itself as a community union, advocating strongly for the new deal for cities, and playing key roles in the defense of public health care, the fight for public, quality, child care, and in resisting attempts to privatize water and electricity services across the country.

Moist has served as co-chair of Manitoba Premier Gary Doer's Economic Advisory Council and vice-chair of the Manitoba Public Insurance Corporation. He has also served his community as treasurer of the United Way and as a director of the Winnipeg Library Foundation and the Misericordia Health Centre.  He is a vice-president of the Canadian Labour Congress.

Moist studied Canadian history and politics at University of Manitoba from which he received a bachelor of arts degree. He is a member and a supporter of the New Democratic Party.

References

Trade unionists from Manitoba
Canadian Union of Public Employees people
Living people
New Democratic Party people
People from Winnipeg
University of Manitoba alumni
Year of birth missing (living people)